Hugh Moffitt Wragge (11 October 1882 – 17 March 1954) was an Australian politician.

He was born in Sydney to storekeeper William Bullock Wragge and Margaret Jane Nixon. A solicitor from 1908, he settled in Gunnedah where he had a practice. On 5 April 1911 he married Margaret Thom Wildridge, with whom he had two daughters. From 1932 to 1949 he was a Country Party member of the New South Wales Legislative Council. Wragge died in Sydney in 1954.

References

1882 births
1954 deaths
National Party of Australia members of the Parliament of New South Wales
Members of the New South Wales Legislative Council
20th-century Australian politicians